La Quebrada (Spanish for "gulch" or "ravine") is one of the most famous tourist attractions in Acapulco, Mexico. Divers entertain tourists by jumping off either of two ledges on the cliff, one that is 40 feet (12 m) high and the top one which is 80 feet (24 m) high. The divers must calculate the right moment to jump to catch an incoming wave and avoid serious injury or death.  Occasionally jumpers dive with a torch. Most of the divers come from the family of Quebrada divers. Although cliff diving at La Quebrada had taken place for many years, it was not until 1934 that the La Quebrada Cliff Divers was formed.

In one of the walls of the cliff there is a path and a restaurant where tourists gather to watch the human divers and to view pelicans diving for fish.

History 
Due to the orography of the port, intense heat was concentrated causing diseases in the population such as cholera and scurvy, so the doctor of the Spanish Crown, Francisco Javier Balmis, proposed a project to open a channel in the area that would allow air the center of the city, calling it “Abra de San Nicolás”. In 1799 the works began, but it was left unfinished due to lack of financial resources.

It was until 1876 when Colonel José María Lopetegui continued with the works to open a gap that would serve as ventilation for the port. The soldiers under his command removed several thousand cubic meters of rock, a task that is described as heroic for the purpose that was pursued in favor of the population. But again the work was suspended; the lack of resources slowed down progress in difficult terrain, the arduous work was stopped, remaining as it is known and hence the name: "La Quebrada". 

On one of the cliff walls there is a path with a railing, and a restaurant, as well as a viewpoint, from where you can see the divers, even pelicans doing the same to catch fish.

See also
 La Quebrada Cliff Divers

References

External links
 

Geography of Guerrero
Tourist attractions in Mexico
Tourist attractions in Guerrero